Sarah Hopkins may refer to:
 Sarah Hopkins Bradford (1818–1912), American writer and historian
 Sarah Winnemucca Hopkins (1844–1891), Native American author, activist and educator
 Sarah Hopkins (writer), Australian criminal lawyer and novelist